KEZAD or Khalifa Economic Zones Abu Dhabi - KEZAD Group was launched by AD Ports Group on September 19, 2022 as part of the plan to consolidate and grow its Economic Cities and Free Zones offering.

Background
As part of its efforts to achieve economic diversification by 2030, the Abu Dhabi Government drew up plans to launch a multibillion-dollar industrial park and ports operation on a greenfield site in Taweelah (adjacent to the newly built Khalifa Port) which would become the emirate's first industrial free zone offering 100 per cent foreign ownership. By 2030, Kizad is expected to contribute up to 15% of the emirate's non-oil GDP.

Location
Besides its proximity to the state-of-the-art Khalifa Port, the industrial zone is located almost equidistant between Abu Dhabi and Dubai, with extended frontage along the E11 Highway connecting the two cities. An additional arterial roadway is planned, linking Kizad to Al Ain, the UAE's largest inland city. In addition, these roads link the zone to three major international airports – Abu Dhabi International Airport, Al Maktoum International Airport, and Dubai International Airport.

KEZAD's strategic location linking east and the west, and its intermodal infrastructure linking sea, air, roads and rail, gives investors easy and efficient access to over 4.5 billion consumers within four time zones.

Objective

KIZAD's primary objective is to attract foreign investments with will generate job opportunities for skilled Emiratis and expatriates alike. According to the KIZAD official website: "The economic benefits are obvious – by 2030, KIZAD will be expected to contribute around 15% of Abu Dhabi’s non-oil GDP. It will be a powerful magnet for foreign direct investment, with global business locating large-scale primary and downstream manufacturing facilities in the Industrial Zone. It is anticipated that between 60% and 80% of the goods manufactured within Kizad will be exported, adding further value to the nation’s economy."

KIZAD Logistics Park
For logistics operations, firms based in the KIZAD Logistics Park (KLP) enjoy facilities including high-spec pre-built warehouses spread over 1.3 million square feet.

Investors
KIZAD’s anchor investor, Emirates Aluminium (EMAL), which aims to be one of the world's largest single-site aluminium smelters, began operations in 2009. It currently produces 800,000 tons of aluminium at Kizad and with increasing demand for aluminium, the local market will reach 1.3 million tons with the inauguration of its phase two very soon.

According to media reports, KIZAD could lead to the creation of more than 150,000 jobs due to a deal signed with more than 50 local and international companies. By late 2013, these logistics and heavy industry manufacturing investors included Bauer, KSB, Al Braik Investments LLC, Palletco, Brasil Foods (BRF), City Pharmacy, and Emirates Calcium Carbonate Factory  which all signed up long-term leases at Kizad and began constructing facilities on the site.

In a March 2014, media interview, KIZAD's then CEO, Samir Chaturvedi, stated the industrial zone will hand over pre-built warehouses spread across more than one million square feet in the newly developed Kizad Logistics Park (KLP) to tenants later that month. The interview followed on from the news that major UAE supermarket chain, Spinneys, had inked a 50-year deal to build and operate a dedicated cold storage distribution centre across 382.9 thousand square feet in KIZAD.

See also

 Musaffah Port, the dedicated port for Abu Dhabi's Musaffah Industrial Zone
 Zayed Port, the port of Abu Dhabi City

References

External links
 KIZAD (Khalifa Industrial Zone) Official website
 Abu Dhabi Ports Official website

2010 establishments in the United Arab Emirates
Companies based in Abu Dhabi
Special economic zones
Central Region, Abu Dhabi
Free-trade zones of the United Arab Emirates